Mount Queena is a  elevation mountain summit located in the Boundary Ranges of the Coast Mountains, in the U.S. state of Alaska. Although modest in elevation, relief is significant since the east aspect of the mountain rises over 3,200 feet above the Gilkey Glacier in less than one mile.

Climate

Based on the Köppen climate classification, Mount Queena has a subarctic climate with cold, snowy winters, and cool summers. Most weather fronts originate in the Pacific Ocean, and travel east toward the Coast Mountains where they are forced upward by the range (Orographic lift), causing them to drop their moisture in the form of rain or snowfall. As a result, the Coast Mountains experience high precipitation, especially during the winter months in the form of snowfall. Temperatures can drop below −20 °C with wind chill factors below −30 °C. The months June and July offer the most favorable weather for viewing this rarely climbed peak.

See also

Geospatial summary of the High Peaks/Summits of the Juneau Icefield
Geography of Alaska

References

External links
 National Weather Service Forecast
 Flickr photo

Mountains of Alaska
Mountains of Juneau, Alaska
Boundary Ranges
North American 2000 m summits